Tripe soup, tripe stew or tripe chorba is a soup or stew made with tripe (cow or lamb/mutton stomach). It is widely (not universally) considered to be a hangover remedy.

Etymology 

Middle East and Southeastern Europe 

Tripe chorba is a common dish in Balkan, Eastern European and Middle Eastern cuisines. It is widely (not universally) considered to be a hangover remedy.

In Greek cuisine, tripe soup is known as patsas.

In Iranian cuisine, sirabi also known as sirab shir-dun is the name for tripe soup and it can be made with either calf or cow tripe or lamb tripe.

Bulgaria 

In Bulgaria, škembe čorba is make with whole pork, beef or lamb tripe boiled for few hours, chopped in small pieces, and returned to the broth. The soup is spiced with ground red paprika which is briefly fried (запръжка), and often small quantity of milk is added. Traditionally, the soup is served with mashed garlic in vinegar and hot red pepper. There is a variant of the soup with intestines instead of tripe.

The soup was very popular with the working classes until the late 1980s, and there were many restaurants serving only shkembe chorba (шкембеджийница, "shkembe-restaurant"). Later they were replaced by fast food restaurants but the soup is still highly regarded, and is part of the menu in any cheap to moderately-priced restaurant.

Romania 

The Romanian name for the sour tripe soup is ciorbă de burtă (from ciorbă 'sour soup' < Turkish çorba + burtă 'tripe'). The Romanian ciorbă de burtă is similar to ciorbă de ciocănele (soup from pork legs). Ciorbă de burtă is often thickened with flour, high fat sour cream/creme fraiche and egg yolks, colored with fried grated carrots or peppers, and seasoned with vinegar, high fat sour cream (smântână) and garlic dip (crushed garlic mixed with oil), called mujdei. The Romanian journalist Radu Anton Roman said this about Ciorbă de burtă: "This dish looks like it is made for drunk coachmen but it has the most sophisticated and pretentious mode of preparation in all Romanian cuisine. It's sour and sweet, hot and velvety, fatty but delicate, eclectic and simple at the same time."

If sour base made of fermented wheat bran called borş is used in sour tripe soup, the sour soup is called a borş, not a ciorbă.

Serbia 
In Serbia, this soup is made of fresh tripe cooked with onions, garlic and paprika. It is usually seasoned with fried bacon and more garlic, sometimes thickened with flour. Some versions of shkembe chorba are made with milk; garlic, vinegar, and chili peppers are often added as seasoning.

Turkey 

In Turkey, tripe chorba (işkembe çorbası) is generally made of cow's stomach and eaten usually with a vinegar-garlic sauce added on the table or with the addition of an egg yolk-lemon juice (called terbiye) in the kitchen, after cooking and before service. A dish can be ordered and made from the various parts of the stomach: "". As in several other countries, it is seen as a "hangover remedy" and finds itself a place in almost all New Year's Eve menus, served right after midnight. This has been the case since the 1800s, when it was first reported as a popular soup among Ottomans to consume immediately after a session of heavy social drinking, usually of rakı.

Central Europe 
In Croatian cuisine, it is known as Fileki, Tripice or Vampi.

In Czech cuisine, tripe soup is heavily spiced with paprika, onions and garlic resulting in very distinct spicy goulash-like flavour. The Czech name is dršťková polévka, often shortened to dršťkovka.

In German cuisine, there are a number of different versions of sour tripe soup from southern parts of the country, including Bavaria, Saxony and Swabia. Seasonings include lard, onions, garlic, meat broth, wine vinegar, bay leaf, salt, and pepper. In the nineteenth century in parts of the German Empire that are now Poland (like Silesia), flaki were a street food. The tripe was cooked with long bones, celery root, parsley root, onions, and bay leaf. The tripe was then sliced, breaded and fried, and returned to the broth with some vinegar, marjoram, mustard, salt, and pepper.

In Hungarian cuisine, tripe soup is called pacalleves or simply pacal. Pacalpörkölt is a tripe stew heavily spiced with paprika.

In Polish cuisine, tripe soup is known as flaki or flaczki.

In Slovak cuisine, it is known as držková polievka.

Western and Southern Europe 
In French cuisine, tripes à la mode de Caen is a traditional dish of the cuisine of Normandy.

In Italian cuisine, trippa alla fiorentina is a traditional dish of the Florence and trippa alla milanese or busecca is a traditional dish of Milan. Caldume (Italian) or quarumi (Sicilian) is a Sicilian dish of veal tripe stewed with vegetables, served as a street food in Palermo and Catania.

North and South America 
In Caribbean and Latin American cuisines, tripe soup known as sopa de mondongo is eaten.

In Mexican cuisine, menudo, a tripe soup with red chili pepper based-broth, is eaten.

East and Southeast Asia 
In Chinese cuisine, Lanzhou-style lamian noodle soup is made with tripes.

In Indonesian cuisine, sekba or bektim is made using pork tripes and other offals. It is one of Chinese-Indonesian dishes.

In Filipino cuisine, sopa de mondongo is eaten.

Similar dishes 
A similar dish made with trotters, called pache or pacha is found in the Turkish, Greek, Balkan, and Eastern European cuisines.

See also 
 List of soups
 Flaki
 Menudo
 Sopa de mondongo
 Tripes à la mode de Caen

References

Further reading 
 

Soups
Offal dishes